Myanmar Cricket Federation is the official governing body of the sport of cricket in Myanmar. Myanmar Cricket Federation is Myanmar's representative at the International Cricket Council and is an associate member and has been a member of that body since 2006. It is also a member of the Asian Cricket Council.

References

External links
Asian Cricket Council-Myanmar

Cricket administration
Sports governing bodies in Myanmar